The so-called Territorialist School is a contemporary approach to urban and regional planning and design grown out from the work of a number of Italian scholars, among whom Alberto Magnaghi (Torino, 1941, for many years professor and currently professor emeritus at the University of Florence) is the most prominent figure.

Starting from a critique of the sustainable development concept, where both a strictly environmental vision of sustainability and the global quantitative development were challenged, the school has focused on the increasingly important role of local qualitative development and elaborated the concept of “local self-sustainable development”. This concept emphasized the balance between: directing development towards fundamental human requirements (which cannot be reduced to material needs alone); self-reliance and the development of self-government by local society; and enhancing environmental quality.

The Territorialist approach intends to combine these three objectives, according priority to "place-consciousness", i.e. a reflexive relation with local identity and heritage (with reference to the themes of bio-regionalism dealt with by Patrick Geddes), viewed as the strategic keys for a sustainable future. The definition of ‘heritage’ adopted by this school is an extensive one, identifying each ‘territorio’ both with its people and places, and including environment, landscape, urban features, local knowledge, culture and crafts in its unique character as a living entity.

This type of approach stresses the increasingly important role of the territory itself when tackling the problems of sustainability, and consequently assumes the arts and crafts of producing territorial quality as a key element for lasting wealth.

Methodology 

A planning process scheme for local self-sustainable development: the "hydraulic" scheme by Alberto Magnaghi.

Main international References 
Magnaghi, Alberto, The Urban Village: A Charter for Democracy and Local Self-sustainable Development, Zed Books, London and New York 2005 
Goldsmith, Edward, “Preface” to Alberto Magnaghi’s The Urban Village 
Magnaghi, Alberto, Le projet local, Pierre Mardaga, Sprimont 2003
Magnaghi, Alberto, La Biorégion Urbaine. Petit Traité sur le Territoire Bien Commun, Eterotopia France, Paris 2014
Magnaghi, Alberto, La Conscience du Lieu, Eterotopia France, Paris 2017
Poli, Daniela, Formes et Figures du Projet Local. La Patrimonialisation Contemporaine du Territoire, Eterotopia France, Paris 2018
Small, Mike, “Universalism and the Genius Loci: Geddes in Cyprus, Italy, Catalonia and Japan”, in W. Stephen, A Vigorous Institution: The Living Lefacy of Patrick Geddes, Luath Press, Edinburgh 2007
Jongerden, Joost, “The Urban Village: Territorialization of Sustainable Development”, Tailoring Biotechnologies, n. 2 2006
Magnaghi, Alberto, “A Green Core for the Polycentric Urban Region of Central Tuscany and the Arno Master Plan”, in ISoCaRP Review 02, Cities between Integration and Disintegration: opportunities and challenges, ISoCaRP, Sitges 2006

Magnaghi, Alberto, "Local Utopia: Towards a Fair and Non-hierarchical Bottom-up Globalization" in ISoCaRP, Planning in a more Globalized and Competitive World, ed. by Paolo La Greca, Gangemi, Rome 2005
Magnaghi, Alberto, "Local self-sustainable Development: Subjects of Transformation", Tailoring Bio-technologies, n.1 2005
Choay, Françoise, "Utopia and the Anthropological Foundation of Built Space", in van Schaik, Martin, Máčel, Otakar (eds.), Exit Utopia. Architectural Provocations 1956-76, IHAAU-TU -  Prestel, Munich/Berlin/London/New-York 2005
Magnaghi, Alberto, "The Local Proiect: Summing up a Political Vision", in Paloscia, Raffaele (ed.), The Contested Metropolis. Six Cities at the Beginning of the 21st Century, INURA - Birkhauser, Basel-Boston-Berlin 2004
Magnaghi, Alberto, Le Territoire des Habitants: pour un Projet Local Durable, Fondation Jan Tanghe, Brugge 2001
Charter for a New Municipium , a collective agreement among Local Authorities, scientists and social committees for the promotion of a Fair and Non-hierarchical Bottom-up Globalization
Magnaghi, Alberto, "The 'Territorialist' Approach to Local Self-Sustainable Development", Plurimondi, Dedalo, Rome 2000

Magnaghi, Alberto, “Territorial Heritage: A Genetic Code for Sustainable Development”, in INURA (ed.), Possible Urban Worlds: Urban Strategies at the End of the 20th Century, Birkhäuser, Basel/Boston/Berlin 1998

More References in Italian language 
Magnaghi, Alberto, Il Principio Territoriale, Bollati Boringhieri, Turin 2020
Magnaghi, Alberto (ed.), La Regola e il Progetto. Un Approccio Bioregionalista alla Pianificazione del Territorio, Firenze University Press, Florence 2014
Ferraresi, Giorgio, Rossi-Doria, Bernardo, "Scenari Strategici come Progetto di Territorio: Contributi alla Definizione della Scuola Territorialista", in Magnaghi, Alberto (ed.), Scenari Strategici. Visioni Identitarie per il Progetto di Territorio, Alinea, Florence 2007
Magnaghi, Alberto (ed.), La Rappresentazione Identitaria del Territorio, Alinea, Florence 2005
Magnaghi, Alberto, Il Progetto Locale, Bollati Boringhieri, Turin 2000
Magnaghi, Alberto (ed.), Il Territorio degli Abitanti: Società Locali e Sostenibilità, Dunod, Milan 1998
Magnaghi, Alberto (ed.), Il Territorio dell'Abitare: lo Sviluppo Locale come Alternativa Strategica, Franco Angeli, Milan 1990

External links 
 Società dei Territorialisti e delle Territorialiste ONLUS ("Territorialist Society") , the international Association (based in Italy) for the development and the promotion of territorialism throughout the world scientific community
 Réseau des Territorialistes ("French Territorialist Network") , the French Association for the development and the promotion of territorialism
 LaPEI, the Laboratory for the Ecological Design of Settlements  established in 1990 in the University of Florence, since then coordinated by Alberto Magnaghi, and representing the main common place for the theoretical elaborations and practical applications of the territorialist research/action approach
 ARNM or Rete del Nuovo Municipio ("New Municipium Network") , the Italian Association among Cities and territories, local Authorities, scientists and social committees aimed at the promotion of local self-sustainable development by means of Participatory democracy and Active citizenship
 Lectures - Lire l'architecture, Projections, 2011 (French)

Planning